Austria participated in the Eurovision Song Contest 2003 with the song "Weil der Mensch zählt" written and performed by Alf Poier. The Austrian broadcaster Österreichischer Rundfunk (ORF) organised the national final Song.Null.Drei in order to select the Austrian entry for the 2003 contest in Riga, Latvia. Ten songs competed in a televised show where a public vote split between male and female voters exclusively selected "Weil der Mensch zählt" performed by Alf Poier as the winner.

Austria competed in the Eurovision Song Contest which took place on 24 May 2003. Performing during the show in position 2, Austria placed sixth out of the 26 participating countries, scoring 101 points.

Background

The Austrian national broadcaster, Österreichischer Rundfunk (ORF), broadcasts the event within Austria and organises the selection process for the nation's entry. ORF confirmed their intentions to participate at the 2003 Eurovision Song Contest on 27 November 2002. From 1995 to 2000, ORF has held an internal selection to choose the artist and song to represent Austria at the contest. For the 2002 Eurovision Song Contest, the broadcaster had set up national finals with several artists to choose both the song and performer to compete at Eurovision for Austria. On 11 January 2003, the broadcaster announced that the Austrian entry for the 2003 contest would be selected through a national final.

Before Eurovision

Song.Null.Drei 
Song.Null.Drei (Song.Zero.Three) was the national final that selected Austria's entry for the Eurovision Song Contest 2003. The competition took place on 14 March 2003 at the ORF Center in Vienna, hosted by Gabriela Dorschner and DJ Ötzi and broadcast on ORF eins. The first part of the national final was watched by 812,000 viewers in Austria with a market share of 33%, while the second part was watched by 733,000 viewers in Austria with a market share of 40%.

Format 
Ten songs competed in the competition where the winner was selected exclusively by public voting. Viewers were able to vote via telephone or SMS and the results were split between male and female voters, each of them which created an overall ranking from which points from 1 (lowest) to 10 (highest) were distributed. After the combination of both scores, the entry with the highest number of points was selected as the winner.

Competing entries 
Ten artists were nominated by record companies and revealed on 25 February 2003. Among the competing artists were former Austrian Eurovision representatives Petra Frey who represented Austria in the Eurovision Song Contest 1994, and Stella Jones (as part of Substitute) who represented Austria in the Eurovision Song Contest 1995.

Final 
The televised final took place on 14 March 2003. Ten songs competed and public televoting split between male and female voters selected "Weil der Mensch zählt" performed by Alf Poier as the winner.

At Eurovision
According to Eurovision rules, all nations with the exceptions of the bottom ten countries in the 2002 contest competed in the final on 24 May 2003. On 29 November 2002, a special allocation draw was held which determined the running order and Austria was set to perform in position 2, following the entry from Iceland and before the entry from Ireland. Austria finished in sixth place with 101 points.

The show was broadcast in Austria on ORF eins with commentary by Andi Knoll. The Austrian spokesperson, who announced the Austrian votes during the final, was Dodo Roscic.

Voting 
Below is a breakdown of points awarded to Austria and awarded by Austria in the contest. The nation awarded its 12 points to Turkey in the contest.

References

External links
Austrian National Final page

2003
Countries in the Eurovision Song Contest 2003
Eurovision